Li Shanshan (born February 22, 1992, in Huangshi, Hubei) is a Chinese gymnast known for her balance beam routines. She was a member of the Chinese silver medal-winning team at the 2007 World Artistic Gymnastics Championships in Stuttgart, Germany. There, she also won the silver medal on the balance beam, despite falling during a full spin, because her start value (A-score) was a 7.3, much higher than the A-Score of gold-medalist Nastia Liukin, which was 6.6.

She was a member of the Chinese Olympic team and won a gold medal for the team event at the 2008 Olympic Games in Beijing, China. In qualifications for the balance beam event final, she placed first. However, during the event final, she fell on a full-twisting Korbut flip and placed 6th, scoring 15.300. Her last 2008 competition was the 14th Artistic Gymnastics World Cup in Madrid, Spain where she won a bronze medal on balance beam, with a score of 15.150.

She announced her retirement in December 2009 along with Xiao Sha.

Competitions Highlights

Floor Music
2007 "Grieg's Piano Concerto in A minor" by Maksim
2007 World Championships "Wonder Land" by Maksim Mrvica

References

 

1992 births
Living people
Chinese female artistic gymnasts
Gymnasts at the 2008 Summer Olympics
Medalists at the World Artistic Gymnastics Championships
Olympic gold medalists for China
Olympic gymnasts of China
People from Huangshi
Olympic medalists in gymnastics
Gymnasts from Hubei
Medalists at the 2008 Summer Olympics
Central University of Finance and Economics alumni